The Gallant Fool may refer to:

 The Gallant Fool (1926 film), an American silent film directed by Duke Worne
 The Gallant Fool (1933 film), an American film directed by  Robert N. Bradbury